HeroBox sends custom care packages to American soldiers around the world. Founder, Ryan Housley, realized the need for customized care packages after receiving requests for specific items from his younger brother who was deployed in Iraq.  The standard care packages were not always meeting the troops needs or wants.  This was mostly because the soldiers did not have direct input regarding the preparation of their care package.  HeroBox allows the soldier to customize their care package so they are receiving exactly what they need and want.  What started as a family's simple effort of supporting their Hero, has grown into a non-profit organization supporting all American Heroes in the United States Armed Forces.  HeroBox launched their official website on Memorial Day 2008 where soldiers can order and customize their HeroBoxes online.

References

External links

Non-profit organizations based in Georgia (U.S. state)
United States military support organizations